Jeffress is an English surname.  Notable people with the surname include:

Gary Jeffress, American academic
Gene Jeffress (born 1948), American politician
Jeremy Jeffress (born 1987), American baseball pitcher
Neville Jeffress (1920–2007), Australian advertising executive
Robert Jeffress (born 1955), American pastor
Steven Jeffress (born 1975), Australian golfer
Arthur Jeffress (1905-1961), Patron of the Arts
Michael S. Jeffress (born 1972), American Academic, Disability Studies Scholar

English-language surnames